The Campaign of Cherchell occurred in July 1531 when Charles V sent the admiral Andrea Doria to take Cherchell as a bridgehead in North Africa.

Andrea Doria launched an expedition against Cherchell under the instructions of Emperor Charles V. A French fleet of 13 galleys took part under Andrea Doria. Doria was supported by 32 galleys, 8 galleons, 5 brigantines, 2 laten sails and 3 ships.

In July 1531 the admiral left Genoa and landed at Cherchell with 1,500 men. He seized the city and liberated several hundred Christian slaves. While the troops disbanded to engage in looting the Turks took advantage, they massacred and routed the invaders. The Turks took 600 captives.

Some of the other Turks opened fire on the galleys, as a result Doria set sail fearing that he may see his vessels sink and understanding that his soldiers were hopelessly lost. Barbarossa, equipped with 35 galleys, attacked Doria near Genoa and burnt 22 Genoese galleys.

References

Battles involving the Ottoman Empire